Vágar Municipality (Vága kommuna) is a municipality in the Faroese Islands.

It covers the eastern part of the island of Vágar (while Sørvágur Municipality covers the western part of the island).

It was created on 1 January 2009 by fusing the two municipalities of Miðvágur (including the towns of Miðvágur and Vatnsoyrar) and Sandavágur (including the town of Sandavágur).

References

Municipalities of the Faroe Islands
Vágar